The 2014 S.League season is Geylang International's 19th season in the top flight of Singapore football and 39th year in existence as a football club.

Squad

Coaching staff

Pre-Season Transfers

In

Out

Mid-Season Transfers

In

Out

Pre-Season Friendlies

IFA Shield 2014

Club Friendlies

S.League

Round 1

Round 2

Round 2.5

Singapore League Cup

Singapore Cup

Squad statistics

Appearances and Goals

|-
|}

Goalscorers

Disciplinary record

Awards

Eagles Player of the Month Award

S.League Night Awards

References 

Geylang International FC seasons
Geylang International